The Lancia Jolly was a light commercial vehicle produced by the Italian vehicle manufacturer Lancia between 1959 and 1963. In four years, 3011 units were produced.

The low-loading Jolly, based on the Appia passenger car, was available with van or pick-up bodywork. An updated version with a bigger engine, called the Super Jolly, replaced it.

The code name of the Jolly was 809.

Technical characteristics
The Jolly was powered by a four-cylinder, 1,090 cc engine producing 36.5 hp.

Share taxis
Jolly
Vehicles introduced in 1959